Bad Bargain is an original novel based on the U.S. television series Buffy the Vampire Slayer.

Plot summary

Having sealed the Hellmouth, the Scooby Gang do not realise that anything is odd when things to be sold at the first annual band fund-raising rummage sale are stored in the school basement, which is directly above the Hellmouth.

The rummage sale begins, and the items on sale seem to be having an unexpected effect on those that buy them. Even Xander and Willow are soon affected. The situation gets more serious resulting in the school being quarantined leaving Buffy and Giles to sort things out before the items get sold elsewhere.

Continuity

Timing

Its place in the wider Buffyverse chronology is within season 2, after the events of 'Lie to Me', and before 'What's My Line?'.

Canonical issues

Buffy novels, such as this one are generally not considered by fans as part of canon. They are usually not viewed as official Buffyverse reality, but are novels from the authors' imaginations. However unlike fanfic, 'overviews' summarising their story, written early in the writing process, were 'approved' by Fox, who in turn may or may not have sought approval from Whedon (or his office). The book will be published as  official Buffy merchandise.

External links
Whedonesque.com - Whedonesquers discuss the book in April 2006
Nika Summer's Buffy Library - includes synopses and reviews of earlier Buffy novels.

2006 novels
Books based on Buffy the Vampire Slayer